Grigoriopol (Moldovan Cyrillic: Григориопол) is a town in the Administrative-Territorial Units of the Left Bank of the Dniester, Moldova. It is the seat of the Grigoriopol District of Transnistria.
Grigoriopol is composed of the city itself, and a small village Crasnoe (Красное). The town itself had a population of 11,473 in 2004.

In 1996 and in 2002, the town was the centre of a dispute regarding the attempts of local Moldavian inhabitants to use the Romanian language (written with Latin script characters) in the local Moldavian school, which is against the policy of the government of Transnistria. The Transnistrian press attacked the local authorities "that allowed the fifth column of Moldova in Transnistria to operate". The head of the Parent-Teacher Association of the Moldavian school, Mihai Speian, was arrested by the Transnistrian authorities on August 28, 2002. He was released on September 12, following a protest by the Organization for Security and Co-operation in Europe mission in Moldova. The school was moved to the village of Doroțcaia, Dubăsari district, which is in the area controlled by the Republic of Moldova.

In 1989, the population of the city was 11,712. According to the 2004 Census in Transnistria, the city itself had 11,473 inhabitants, including 5,570 Moldavians, 3,275 Russians, 2,248 Ukrainians, 83 Germans, 67 Belarusians, 63 Bulgarians, 46 Armenians, 39 Poles, 26 Gagauzians, 14 Jews, and 42 others and non-declared.

Notable people 

 Konstantin Gedroits (1872 in Grigoriopol – 1932), Ukrainian painter and geologist
 Oleksandr Danylyuk (born 1975 in Grigoriopol), Ukrainian politician and former finance minister of Ukraine
 Roman Rozna (born 1976 in Grigoriopol), a male hammer thrower from Moldova, competed in the 2000, 2004 and 2008 Summer Olympics

References

External links
 Grigoriopol in the Geographical Dictionary of the Kingdom of Poland (1881) 
Grigoriopol, the Armenian colony

Cities and towns in Transnistria
Cities and towns in Moldova
Populated places on the Dniester
Tiraspolsky Uyezd
Grigoriopol District